United Nations Security Council resolution 1426, adopted without a vote on 24 July 2002, after examining the application of the Swiss Confederation for membership in the United Nations, the Council recommended to the General Assembly that Switzerland be admitted.

In a March 2002 referendum, the 54.6% of Swiss voters endorsed a government plan to apply for membership in the United Nations. The General Assembly later admitted Switzerland to the United Nations on 10 September 2002 under Resolution 57/1.

See also
 Enlargement of the United Nations
 Member states of the United Nations
 List of United Nations Security Council Resolutions 1401 to 1500 (2002–2003)

References

External links
 
Text of the Resolution at undocs.org

 1426
 1426
 1426
2002 in Switzerland
July 2002 events